Das Nachtlager in Granada (The Night Camp in Granada) is a romantic opera in two acts by Conradin Kreutzer. The libretto is by  based on Johann Friedrich Kind's 1818 drama of the same name.

Performance history
The premiere of a first version with spoken dialogue was performed on 13 January 1834 at Theater in der Josefstadt, Vienna. The second version (with recitatives) was performed on 9 March 1837 at Theater am Kärntnertor.

It was subsequently given in London at the former Prince's Theatre on 13 May 1840, and in New York City on 15 December 1862.

Roles

Synopsis
Place: Granada in Spain
Time: middle of the 16th century

References

Further reading
 The Met Recordings 
 Synopsis
Warrack, John and West, Ewan (1992), The Oxford Dictionary of Opera, 782 pages,

External links 
 Das Nachtlager in Granada : romantische Oper in 2 Akten, 1880 publication on archive.org
 
 Libretto 
 , Bratislava Philharmonic Orchestra and Chorus, conductor: Kurt Wöss

Operas by Conradin Kreutzer
German-language operas
1834 operas
Operas
Operas set in Spain
Operas based on plays
Operas set in the 16th century